The siege of Dapur occurred as part of Pharaoh Ramesses II's campaign to suppress Galilee and conquer Syria in 1269 BC. He described his campaign on the wall of his mortuary temple, the Ramesseum in Thebes, Egypt. The inscriptions say that Dapur was "in the land of Hatti".  Although Dapur has often been identified with Tabor in Canaan, Egyptologist Kenneth Kitchen argues that this identification is incorrect and that the Dapur in question was in Syria, north of Kadesh.

Egyptian reliefs depict Dapur as a heavily fortified settlement with both inner and outer walls and situated on a rocky hill, which was usual for Bronze Age settlements in Syria and abroad, Egypt was also Fortified.

Contemporary illustrations of the siege show the use of ladders, chariots, and mounted cavalry with Egyptian soldiers climbing scale ladders supported by archers. Six of the sons of Ramesses, still wearing their side locks, also appear on those depictions of the siege. Those include:

References

 James Henry Breasted, Ancient Records of Egypt, Part III § 359.

13th century BC
Sieges
Battles involving ancient Egypt
Battles involving the Hittite Empire
Siege
2nd-millennium BC conflicts